The ECAC Hockey Best Defensive Forward  is an annual award given out at the conclusion of the ECAC Hockey regular season to the best defensive forward in the conference as voted by the coaches of each ECAC team.

The Best Defensive Forward was first awarded in 1993 (the same year that the Best Defensive Defenseman award was revived) and every year thereafter. Three players (Ian Sharp, Stephen Baby and Nico Sturm) have received the award two separate times, all three doing so in consecutive years.

Award winners

Winners by school

Winners by position

See also
ECAC Hockey Awards

References

General

Specific

External links
ECAC Hockey Awards (Incomplete)

College ice hockey trophies and awards in the United States